Boylston is an unincorporated community located in the town of Superior, Douglas County, Wisconsin, United States.  It is along County Road C near Wisconsin Highway 35.  Boylston is south of the city of Superior.

Wolves are known to frequent the area.

Notes

Unincorporated communities in Douglas County, Wisconsin
Unincorporated communities in Wisconsin